The Ferrée River (in French: Rivière Ferrée) is a tributary of the south shore of the St. Lawrence River where it flows into the small hamlet of Village-des-Aulnaies, located southwest of the village of La Pocatière and north-east of the village of Saint-Roch-des-Aulnaies.

Toponymy 
The toponym Rivière Ferrée was formalized on December 5, 1968, at the Commission de toponymie du Québec.

See also

 List of rivers of Quebec

References 

Rivers of Chaudière-Appalaches
L'Islet Regional County Municipality